Wang Phong railway station is a railway station located in Wang Phong Subdistrict, Pran Buri District, Prachuap Khiri Khan Province, Thailand. This station is located nearest to Thanarat Military Base (Infantry Centre), thus, many military trains end here.

In the past, Wang Phong was a water and fueling point as it is located near the Pranburi River. This station also used to have a locomotive depot, and a turntable for the mixed train Thon Buri-Pran Buri, but now all structures have been demolished.

Train services 
 Special Express 37/38 Bangkok-Sungai Kolok-Bangkok
 Rapid 169/170 Bangkok-Yala-Bangkok
 Rapid 173/174 Bangkok-Nakhon Si Thammarat-Bangkok
 Rapid 167/168 Bangkok-Kantang-Bangkok
 Ordinary 251/252 Bang Sue Junction-Prachuap Khiri Khan-Bang Sue Junction
 Ordinary 254/255 Lang Suan-Thon Buri-Lang Suan

References 
 
 

Railway stations in Thailand
Buildings and structures in Prachuap Khiri Khan province